La Esperanza is a community located in Nuevo Laredo Municipality in the Mexican state of Tamaulipas. According to the INEGI Census of 2010, La Esperanza has a population of 69 inhabitants, 39 males and 30 females. Its elevation is 164 meters above sea level.

References

Populated places in Tamaulipas
Laredo–Nuevo Laredo